40 Boötis is a single star located 166.5 light years away from the Sun in the northern constellation of Boötes. It is visible to the naked eye as a dim, yellow-white hued star with an apparent visual magnitude of 5.64. The star is moving away from the Earth with a heliocentric radial velocity of +12 km/s.

The Hipparcos catalogue (1997) lists a stellar classification of F1 III–IV, matching the luminosity class of an aging star that is evolving into a giant. Earlier, Cowley and Bidelman (1979) listed a class of F2 III, while Sato and Kuji (1990) found a main sequence class of F0V. It is around 1.2 billion years old with a relatively high rotation rate, showing a projected rotational velocity of 72.5 km/s. The star has 1.5 times the mass of the Sun and 2.4 times the Sun's radius. It is radiating 11.6 times the luminosity of the Sun from its photosphere at an effective temperature of 7,070 K.

References

F-type giants
Boötes
Durchmusterung objects
Bootis, 40
132772
073369
5588